Statistics of Chinese Taipei National Football League in the 1986 season.

Overview
Taipei City Bank won the championship.

References
RSSSF

1983
1
Taipei
Taipei